The Universal PBM Resource for Oligonucleotide-Binding Evaluation (UniPROBE) is database of DNA-binding proteins determined by protein-binding microarrays.

See also 
 Protein microarray
 DNA-binding domain

References

External links 
 Official website

Biological databases
Microarrays
Proteomics